The British Soap Awards (BSAs) are an annual awards ceremony in the United Kingdom which honours the best moments in British soap operas. The ceremony is televised on ITV and has been presented by Phillip Schofield since 2006. The trophies given to the winners are made from metal and glass and have been manufactured by British firm Creative Awards since their inception.

The majority of the awards are voted for by a panel of industry professionals, while Best British Soap, Best Family and Best Leading Performer are voted for by the general public. The awards for Best Actress and Best Actor were voted for by the public from 1999 to 2019.

History
The first British Soap Awards took place in 1999. Although it is an ITV production, the events were held at the BBC Television Centre, in London until 2009. The ceremonies have since been held at various locations in London and Manchester, including the Granada Studios, the London Studios, dock10, the Hackney Empire, the Palace Theatre and the Lowry. The five soap operas currently nominated for awards are Coronation Street, Doctors, EastEnders, Emmerdale and Hollyoaks. Now-defunct soaps that were formerly nominated for awards were Brookside, Crossroads, Family Affairs and Night and Day.

In 2016, it was reported that the award for outstanding achievement off-screen would be known as the Tony Warren award following the death of Tony Warren, the creator of Coronation Street. On 1 May 2018, ITV announced that for the 20th anniversary of the show, it would be broadcast live for the first time on 2 June 2018. In March 2020, it was announced that the 2020 ceremony had been cancelled due to the COVID-19 pandemic. ITV instead aired a 60-minute special in its place titled The British Soap Awards Celebrates 21 Years, narrated by presenter Philip Schofield. In April 2021, it was announced that the 2021 ceremony had also been cancelled once again due to the pandemic. In April 2022, it was confirmed that the British Soap Awards would be held in June 2022. They also announced the introduction of two new viewer-voted categories, Best Family and Best Leading Performer. With the introduction of  the gender-neutral Best Leading Performer category, it was confirmed that the awards for Best Actress and Best Actor had been axed.

Categories

Best British Soap
Best Comedy Performance
Best Dramatic Performance
Best Family
Best Leading Performer
Best Newcomer
Best On-Screen Partnership
Best Single Episode
Best Storyline
Best Young Performer
Scene of the Year
Villain of the Year
Outstanding Achievement Award
Tony Warren Award

Defunct categories

Best Actor (1999–2019)
Best Actress (1999–2019)
Best Bitch (2004–2006)
Best Exit (1999–2013)
Best Foreign Soap (1999–2000)
Best Female Dramatic Performance (2016–2019)
Best Male Dramatic Performance (2016–2019)
Greatest Moment (2018)
Hero of the Year (2001–2003)
Sexiest Male (1999–2014)
Sexiest Female (1999–2014)
Special Achievement (1999, 2001–2002, 2004–2012)

Ceremonies

1999 winners

2000 winners

2001 winners

2002 winners

2003 winners

2004 winners

2005 winners 
Stan Richards, who played Seth Armstrong in Emmerdale, was remembered during the ceremony, having died in February 2005.

2006 winners

2007 winners

2008 winners
Mike Reid, who played Frank Butcher in EastEnders, was remembered during the ceremony, having died in July 2007.

2009 winners
Clive Hornby, who played Jack Sugden in Emmerdale, was remembered during the ceremony, having died in July 2008. Wendy Richard, who played Pauline Fowler in EastEnders, was also remembered during the ceremony, having died in February 2009.

2010 winners
Maggie Jones, who played Blanche Hunt in Coronation Street, was remembered during the ceremony, having died in December 2009.

2011 winners

2012 winners
Betty Driver, who played Betty Williams in Coronation Street, was remembered during the ceremony, having died in October 2011.

2013 winners
Bill Tarmey, who played Jack Duckworth in Coronation Street, was remembered during the ceremony, having died in November 2012.

2014 winners
Richard Thorp, who played Alan Turner in Emmerdale, was remembered during the ceremony, having died in May 2013. This was also the final ceremony where "Sexiest Male" and "Sexiest Female" were awarded; Michelle Keegan, who plays Tina McIntyre in Coronation Street, won "Sexiest Female" for the sixth time in a row.

2015 winners
Anne Kirkbride, who played Deirdre Barlow in Coronation Street, was remembered during the ceremony, having died in January 2015. John Bardon, who played Jim Branning in EastEnders, was also remembered during the ceremony, having died in September 2014.

This year's ceremony incorporated a "Social Issue Storyline" mention, which is where all of the soap operas' most controversial stories were specially mentioned. These include:
 Steve's depression (Coronation Street)
 John Paul's rape (Hollyoaks)
 Zara's breast-feeding campaign (Doctors)
 Val's HIV diagnosis (Emmerdale)
 Linda's rape (EastEnders)

2016 winners
Peter Baldwin (Derek Wilton in Coronation Street), Stephen Hancock (Ernest Bishop in Coronation Street), Shirley Stelfox (Edna Birch in Emmerdale), Kitty McGeever (Lizzie Lakely in Emmerdale), Kristian Ealey (Matt Musgrove in Brookside and Hollyoaks) and Morag Siller (Marilyn Dingle in Emmerdale) were remembered during the ceremony which was held on 29 May.

2017 winners
The 2017 awards took place on 3 June 2017 at The Lowry in Salford. It was originally planned for the event to be broadcast live for the first time but due to ITV moving the live grand final of Britain's Got Talent into its scheduled timeslot, the awards were instead pre-recorded as before and broadcast on ITV on 6 June 2017. After the end credits in the broadcast version, dedications appeared to Jean Alexander (Hilda Ogden in Coronation Street), who died in October 2016, and Roy Barraclough (Alec Gilroy in Coronation Street), who died in June 2017.

2018 winners
The 2018 awards were broadcast live for the first time on 2 June 2018. Liz Dawn, who played Vera Duckworth in Coronation Street, was remembered during the ceremony, having died in September 2017.

2019 winners 
The 2019 awards were broadcast live on 1 June 2019.

2022 winners
The 2022 awards were broadcast live on 11 June 2022. A tribute was paid to Australian soap opera Neighbours, after filming ended the day before the ceremony, with video messages from Ian Smith (Harold Bishop) and Jackie Woodburne (Susan Kennedy).

The In memoriam segment paid tribute to Paula Tilbrook (Betty Eagleton in Emmerdale), Lynda Baron (Linda Clarke in EastEnders), Mark Eden (Alan Bradley in Coronation Street), Anna Karen (Aunt Sal in EastEnders), Neville Buswell (Ray Langton in Coronation Street), Patricia Brake (Deirdre Foster in EastEnders & Viv Baldwin in Coronation Street), Dame Barbara Windsor (Peggy Mitchell in EastEnders), Leah Bracknell (Zoe Tate in Emmerdale), Leonard Fenton (Dr. Harold Legg in EastEnders), Kay Mellor (Coronation Street & Brookside writer), Sheila Mercier (Annie Sugden in Emmerdale), Frank Mills (Billy Williams in Coronation Street), Johnny Briggs (Mike Baldwin in Coronation Street), Roy Hudd (Archie Shuttleworth in Coronation Street), Stephen Churchett (Marcus Christie in EastEnders), Freddie Jones (Sandy Thomas in Emmerdale), Melanie Clark Pullen (Mary Flaherty in EastEnders), Johnny Leeze (Harry Clayton in Coronation Street & Ned Glover in Emmerdale) and June Brown (Dot Cotton in EastEnders), who all passed away between the 2019 and 2022 ceremonies.

Awards statistics

Note: Crossroads was nominated from 2001 to 2003, but did not receive any awards. The "Best Foreign Soap" category also featured Neighbours, Sunset Beach and The Bold and the Beautiful in 1999.

A. James Bain was a casting director who worked for both Coronation Street and Emmerdale.
B. In 2018, Doctors and EastEnders tied in the "Scene of the Year" award, so they both won.

Footnotes

References

External links
 

1999 establishments in the United Kingdom
Annual events in the United Kingdom
Awards established in 1999
Television series by ITV Studios
The British Soap Awards
Soap opera awards